Jin is the Hanyu pinyin transliteration of a number of Chinese surnames. The most common one, Jīn , literally means "gold" and is 29th in the list of "Hundred Family Surnames".  As of 2006, it is ranked the 64th most common Chinese surname and is sometimes transliterated as Chin.

The other, less common, surnames that are "Jin" in pinyin include Jìn (/) and Jìn.

金 (Jīn)

Mythology

Jin is an ancient surname, dating back over 4,000 years. It was first mentioned during the period ruled by the Yellow Emperor, a legendary Chinese sovereign and cultural hero, who is considered in Chinese mythology to be the ancestor of all Han Chinese. The legend behind the Jin surname is as follows:

The Yellow Emperor's son, Yi Zhi (Shaohao), eventually succeeded him. On the same day he was installed as leader, a golden phoenix flew down and perched on top of a house exactly opposite of where he sat. His followers reckoned it was an auspicious beginning. They decided to use gold as the emblem of their tribe. Yi Zhi was retitled Jin Tian Shi ("golden skies") by his people, and headed the Jin Tian Tribe. Their settlement was located in Qufu (presently Qufu city in Shandong province). Yi Zhi died in 2515 BCE. Some of his descendants adopted Jin as their surnames and left off the words Tian Shi ("skies").

The surname also appeared in an area called Pengcheng (now known as Tong Shan Xian) during the Han Dynasty, from 206BCE to 220BCE.

Origin of Surname Jīn (金)
Jin Midi (金日磾) was with the Xiongnu people during the Han dynasty and received the surname Jīn (金) from Emperor Wu. His father, Xiutu (休屠) was a general-feudal lord of the Xiongnu. Jin Xuan (金旋) and Jin Yi (金禕) were his descendants.
 Qiang people use the surnames Jīn (金), Chang (羌), Gong (功), and Ju-Goo (俱).
 Some of Qian Liu's (錢鏐) descendants received the surname Jīn (金).
 Jin was among the surnames granted to the Kaifeng Jews by an unnamed Song dynasty emperor.
 During the Yuan dynasty, the Chinese Liu (劉) clan received the surname Jīn (金). Jīn Fuxiang (金覆祥).
 Mongolian Ye (也) clan got the surname Jīn (金) during the Ming dynasty
 Taiwanese aborigines received surname Jīn (金), Zhang, amongst others, during the Qing dynasty.
 Aisin Gioro clan got the surname Jīn (金), as "Aisin" means "gold" in Manchu language, following the fall of the Qing dynasty.
 Jin uses the same character as the Korean surname, "Kim". Kim is Korea's most common surname and is also widely found amongst the ethnic Koreans in China.

Notables with the surname 金
 Jin Midi (金日磾)
 Jin Shengtan (金聖嘆) (born Jin Renrui 金人瑞)
 Jin Yuelin (金岳霖)
 Jin Di (sport shooter) (金迪)
 Jin Jing (金晶)
 Jin Fengling (金鳳玲)
 Jin Guliang (金古良), painter of the Wu Shuang Pu
 Jin Jingdao (金敬道)
 Jin Liqun (金立群)
 Keyu Jin
 Jin Luxian (金鲁贤), bishop of Shanghai
 Jin Xing (金星)
 Jin Li (金力)
 Larry Wu-tai Chin
 Jin Renqing (金人慶)
 Jin Yubo (金煜博)
 Jin Zhiyang (金志扬)
 Elaine Jin (金燕玲)
 Ha Jin (born Jin Xuefei 金雪飛)
 Jin Dong
 Jin Chen Gina Jin (金晨), actress
 Jin Yuzhang, of the Aisin-Gioro house
 Jin Yong, penname used by Louis Cha
 Jin Boyang
 Jin Shan
 Jin Sha (singer)
 Jin Sha (poet), Cheng Youshu
 Jin Shuren
 Jin Youzhi
 Jin Qicong
 Kinsen (金川 Jin Chuan), the voice actor for Xiao in Genshin Impact
Cultural works
 Michelle Jin (米歇尔·金), professional bodybuilder
 The Untamed (TV series), features the Jin clan as one of the main groups in the series

Variants
 Chin, an alternate transliteration of Jin
 Gyim, Kim in Middle Chinese
 Kin in Foochow
 Gam, Kam in Cantonese
 Gim, Kim in Korea
 Kim in Hakka and Min Nan variations
 Kim in Vietnamese

靳 (Jìn)
According to legend, Jìn family name originated from Zhu Rong. It was later a clan in the Chu (state). Originally the name was Jian-Jin (篯), but was later changed to Jian-Qian (錢) and Jìn (靳).

Notables with the surname 靳
 Yue-Sai Kan (靳羽西)
Jin Dong (Chinese: 靳东, born 1976), Chinese actor, known for his television roles in Legend of Entrepreneurship (2012)
Jin Ye (靳烨; Jìn Yè; born 1988), Chinese dancer, model and beauty pageant titleholder who was crowned as Miss Universe
 Jin Ruchao, (靳如超, 1960–2001) perpetrator of the Shijiazhuang bombings
Jin Zhun (靳準) (died 318), official of the Chinese/Xiongnu state Han Zhao, who in 318 staged a coup against the Han Zhao emperor and his son-in-law
Empress Jin (靳皇后/金皇后) may refer to one of the following Chinese empresses: Jin Yueguang (靳月光) and Jin Yuehua (靳月華), two of Han Zhao emperor Liu Cong's
Jin Yunpeng (靳云鹏; 1877–1951), Chinese general and politician
Jin Hui (Chinese: 靳辉; born 1988), Chinese footballer who plays for Beijing Renhe in the China League One
Andrew Jin Daoyuan (Chinese: 靳道远; 1929–2019), bishop of the Chinese Patriotic Catholic Association
Jin Guidi (靳贵第; 1915–1937), or Chin Kuai-Ti, Chinese soldier and boxer
Jin Qi (靳琪; born 1997), Chinese footballer who plays for Inner Mongolia Caoshangfei in the China League
Jin Xi (Han), (靳歙), general under Emperor Liu Bang who in 209 BC, "joined in the attack on Qin forces, defeating Li You"
Empress Jin (Yin), (靳皇后, personal name unknown), briefly an empress of the Chinese/Xiongnu state Han Zhao, wife of Liu Can (Emperor Yin)

晋/晉 (Jìn)
Jìn ( family name originate from Táng Shū Yú (唐叔虞) the brother of King Wu of Zhou. He founded the state of Jin and his later descendants used the surname Jìn (晋).

Notables with the surname 晋 
 Jin Xiaomei (晋小梅)

References

Chinese-language surnames
Multiple Chinese surnames